The following is a list of programmes broadcast by Star World and Star World Premiere.

Animation

American Dad!
Archer
The Boss Baby: Back in Business
Dilbert
Family Guy
Futurama
The Simpsons
Son of Zorn

Comedy-Drama

Ally McBeal
Backstrom
Ballers
Barry
Baskets
Better Things
Boston Legal
Bunheads
Californication
Crashing
Crazy Ex-Girlfriend
Curb Your Enthusiasm
Devious Maids
Divorce
Ed
Eli Stone
Entourage
Goodness Gracious Me
The Good Guys
Insecure
Las Vegas
Louie
Monk
Lipstick Jungle
Miss Match
Mr Inbetween
Nurse Jackie
Packed to the Rafters
Parenthood
Psych
Rake
Royal Pains
Sex & Drugs & Rock & Roll
Scream Queens
Scrubs
Togetherness
Ugly Betty
Veep
Wild Card
The Wonder Years

Drama

90210
9-1-1
7th Heaven
24: Legacy
Adventure Inc.
The Adventures of Sinbad
The Affair
Agent Carter
Agents of S.H.I.E.L.D.
The Americans
American Horror Story
Angel
Angels in America
APB
Arrow (Season 1–3; moved to Colors Infinity)
The Assassination of Gianni Versace
Band of Brothers
Banshee
The Bastard Executioner
Baywatch 
Betrayal
Beyond the Break
Beverly Hills, 90210
Big Little Lies
The Blacklist
Blood & Oil
Boardwalk Empire
The Bold and the Beautiful
Bones
Bosch
Boston Public
Breaking Bad
Breakout Kings
The Bridge
Buffy the Vampire Slayer
Burn Notice
The Canterbury Tales
Castle
C.B. Strike
Chance
Charmed
Chernobyl
The Chi
Chicago Hope
The Closer
Cold Case
Combat Hospital
Criminal Minds
Criminal Minds: Suspect Behavior
Damien
Day Break
Dead of Summer
Desire
Desperate Housewives
Detroit 1-8-7
Dexter
Dirty Sexy Money
Downton Abbey
Empire
The Exorcist
Falcon Beach
The Family
Fashion House
Feud
Filthy Rich
Fosse/Verdon
Game of Thrones
Gang Related
General Hospital
Ghost Whisperer
The Gifted
Glee
Grey's Anatomy (Seasons 1–6; moved to Zee Café)
The Hardy Boys
Here & Now
Heroes
His Dark Materials
Home and Away
Homeland
House
How to Get Away with Murder
Intelligence
JAG
Jett
The Jinx
Karen Sisco
The Killing
The Knick
Knight Rider (1982)
Knight Rider (2008)
Law & Order
The Leftovers
Lie to Me
Lights Out
Lilyhammer
The Listener
Lois & Clark: The New Adventures of Superman
Lost
Lucky 7
Luther
Mad Men
Mayans M.C.
The Mentalist
Miami Vice
Mildred Pierce
Missing (2012)
The Missing (2014)
Mosaic
Mrs. America
Murder, She Wrote
NCIS (Seasons 1–6; moved to AXN)
Necessary Roughness
Neighbours
The Newsroom
The Night Of
NYPD Blue 
The O.C.
Olive Kitteridge
Once Upon a Time
One Tree Hill
The Pacific
Pan Am
The Passage
The People v. O. J. Simpson
Person of Interest
Pitch
Pose
The Practice
Prison Break
Private Practice
Proven Innocent
Quantico
Quarry
Queen of the South
Rectify
The Resident
Revenge
Rome
Room 104
Rosewood
Santa Barbara
Sharp Objects
Shots Fired
Show Me a Hero
The Shield
Six Degrees
Sleepy Hollow
Smallville
Snowfall
Sons of Anarchy
The Sopranos
Star
The Strain
Strike Back
Succession
Supernatural (Season 1–5; moved to AXN)
Teen Wolf (Season 1–3; shared with AXN)
Terra Nova
Third Watch
This Is Us
Touch
Trauma
Tru Calling
True Blood
True Detective
Trust
Unforgettable
Unreal
Victoria
Vinyl
The Walking Dead
Walker, Texas Ranger
Warrior
Watchmen
White Collar
The Wire
Xena: Warrior Princess
Zero Hour

News
Aside from entertainment, STAR World also aired news programming in the late 2000s.
Businessweek Asia
Sky News: 9 pm edition (Mondays) 
Sky News: 15 minutes (Tuesday - Saturday) 
Sports Update 
Star News Asia

Reality

American Idol
American Music Awards
America's Got Talent
The Apprentice
Are You Smarter Than a 5th Grader?
Asia's Next Top Model
The Bachelor (Season 1–11; moved to Colors Infinity)
The Bachelorette (Season 1–3; moved to Colors Infinity)
Beauty and the Geek
Best Time Ever with Neil Patrick Harris
Britain's Got Talent
Cops
Criss Angel Mindfreak
Culinary Genius
Dancing with the Stars
The Dewarists
Gordon Ramsay's 24 Hours to Hell and Back
I Dare You: The Ultimate Challenge
I'm a Celebrity...Get Me Out of Here!
Impact! Xplosion
Joe Millionaire
Killer Camp
K-Pop Star Hunt
MasterChef Asia
MasterChef Australia
MasterChef Australia All-Stars
MasterChef Australia Junior
MasterChef Australia: The Professionals
MasterChef US
MasterChef US Junior
Miss Universe
Miss USA
Most Haunted
My Big Fat Obnoxious Fiance
On the Lot
Outback Jack
Primetime Emmy Awards
Project Runway
Q'Viva! The Chosen
The Rachel Zoe Project
Repeat After Me
Rock Star
The Simple Life
Scare Tactics
Sports Illustrated Swimsuit Model Search
Temptation Island
Twist of Taste: Coastal Curries
The Voice
WCW Monday Nitro
WCW Thunder
Whose Line Is It Anyway?
WWE Raw

Science Fiction

Almost Human
Bionic Woman
Colony (shared with Zee Café)
Dark Angel
Devs
Doctor Who (moved from FX)
Eureka
Helix
Kyle XY
Minority Report
Mutant X
The Orville
Revolution
Roswell
Second Chance
Small Wonder
Stargate SG1
Star Trek: Enterprise
Warehouse 13
Wayward Pines
Westworld
The X-Files

Sitcoms

2 Broke Girls
8 Simple Rules
3rd Rock from the Sun
30 Rock
According to Jim
Angel from Hell
Arrested Development
Baby Daddy
Becker
Benched
The Big Bang Theory (Season 1–10; moved to Zee Café)
Black-ish
Community
The Cool Kids
Cooper Barrett's Guide to Surviving Life
The Crazy Ones
Crumbs
Dads
Dharma & Greg
Everybody Loves Raymond
The Drew Carey Show
Episodes
Frasier
Fresh Off the Boat
Friends
Ghosted
The Goldbergs
Grandfathered
The Grinder
Happy Days
Home Improvement
How I Met Your Mother
It's Always Sunny in Philadelphia
Jake in Progress
The Jane Show
LA to Vegas
Just Shoot Me!
The Kumars at No. 42
Last Man Standing
The Last Man on Earth
Life in Pieces
Little Britain
Making History
Malcolm in the Middle
Manhattan Love Story
Melissa & Joey
The Mick
Mind Your Language
Modern Family
Mom (Season 1–2; moved to Comedy Central)
Mrs. Fletcher
Mr. Sunshine
The Muppets
Mystery Girls
My Wife & Kids
The Neighbors
New Girl
The New Normal
The Odd Couple
The Office UK
The Office US
Outmatched
Perfect Harmony
Raising Hope
Rel
Rules of Engagement
Sabrina the Teenage Witch
Seinfeld
Silicon Valley
Single Parents
Sons & Daughters
Speechless
Stark Raving Mad
Still Standing
Suburgatory
That '70s Show
Trophy Wife
Two and a Half Men
Two Guys and a Girl
Vice Principals
Welcome to the Family
What We Do in the Shadows
Yes, Dear

Talk Shows

A Little Late with Lilly Singh
Asia Uncut
The Ellen DeGeneres Show (Season 1–11; moved to Romedy Now)
Front Row with Anupama Chopra
Hollywood Shootout
Jimmy Kimmel Live!
Koffee with Karan
Late Show with Stephen Colbert
The Oprah Winfrey Show
Rendezvous with Simi Garewal
Satyamev Jayate
Simi Selects India's Most Desirable
The Tara Sharma Show
TED Talks India Nayi Soch

References 

Star World